Jesús María Ciriaco Jiménez Zamora (June 18, 1823 – February 12, 1897) was President of Costa Rica on two occasions: 1863 to 1866, and 1868 to 1870.

He was popularly elected in 1863, but dissolved Congress two months into his term of office. During his presidency he granted asylum to former Salvadoran President  Gen. Gerardo Barrios, as a result of which the other four Central American governments broke off diplomatic relations with Costa Rica.

He passed on the presidency democratically to José María Castro Madriz at the end of his mandate in 1866, only to overthrow him in a coup d'état two years later and assume the office of president for a second time. This second mandate, in turn, came to an end in a coup on 27 April 1870.

Jesús Jiménez was the father of three-time President Ricardo Jiménez Oreamuno.

References

1823 births
1897 deaths
Presidents of Costa Rica
Vice presidents of Costa Rica
Leaders who took power by coup
People from Cartago Province
19th-century Costa Rican people
Foreign ministers of Costa Rica
Costa Rican liberals